W.A.K.O. European Championships 2006 in Skopje were the joint eighteenth European kickboxing championships held by the W.A.K.O. organization (the other event was held the previous month in Lisbon).  It was the first event to be held in the country of Republic of Macedonia and was organized by the nation's kickboxing president Ljupčo Nedelkovski,  involving (mainly) amateur men and women from 31 countries across Europe.     

There were three styles on offer at Skopje; Low-Kick, Thai-Boxing and Light-Contact.  The other usual W.A.K.O. styles (Full/Semi Contact, Aero-Kickboxing and Musical Forms) were held at the earlier event in Lisbon.  By the end of the championships Russia were easily the strongest country overall with a massive medals tally with Belarus came a distant second and Serbia not far behind in third place.  The event was held in Skopje, Macedonia over six days, beginning on Tuesday 21 November and ending 26 November 2006.

Participating nations

There were around 31 nations from across Europe participating at the 2006 W.A.K.O. European Championships in Skopje including:

Low-Kick

Similar to Full-Contact kickboxing, contestants in Low-Kick are allowed to kick and punch one another with full force, with the primary difference being that in Low-Kick they are also allowed to kick one another's legs, with matches typically won by decision or stoppage.  As with other forms of amateur kickboxing, various head and body protection must be worn.  More information on the style can be found at the W.A.K.O. website.  Both men and women took part in Low-Kick at Skopje, with the men having twelve weight divisions ranging from 51 kg/112.2 lbs to over 91 kg/+200.2 lbs, and then women having six ranging from 48 kg/105.6 lbs to 70 kg/154 lbs and unlike more recent W.A.K.O. championships (aside from Lisbon) some countries were allowed more than one athlete per weight division.

Notable winners in the category included Zurab Faroyan picking up his 4th gold medal in a row, which included winning in Full-Contact at the other European championships in Lisbon a month or so previously, while countryman Konstantin Sbytov picked up his 3rd gold medal.  Other winners included multiple world champion Eduard Mammadov and Ibragim Tamazaev who had won at the last world championships in Agadir.  Also in medal positions and more recognisable to western and international audiences were Michał Głogowski, Ludovic Millet and Mickael Lallemand who all won bronze medals.  Russia continued her tradition of being the strongest nation in Low-Kick, easily dominating the medal positions with twelve gold, four silver and eight bronze.

Men's Low-Kick Kickboxing Medals Table

Women's Low-Kick Kickboxing Medals Table

Thai-Boxing

Thai-Boxing, more commonly known as Muay Thai, is a type of kickboxing that allows the participants to throw punches, kicks, elbows and knees at full force to legal targets on the opponents body.  Due to the physical nature of the sport, stoppages are not uncommon, although in amateur Thai-Boxing head and body protection must be worn.  At Skopje both men and women took part in the style with the men having twelve weight divisions ranging from 51 kg/112.2 lbs to over 91 kg/+200.2 lbs and the women six, ranging from 52 kg/114.4 lbs to over 70 kg/154 lbs and unlike more recent W.A.K.O. championships (aside from Lisbon) some countries were allowed more than one athlete per weight division.

There were not too many recognisable winners in Thai-Boxing at Skopje although Vitaly Gurkov had won a number of amateur world championships with various organizations prior to this event and would go on to win a K-1 regional tournament as a pro.  By the end of the championships Russia finally overhauled the dominance of Belarus in the style, coming out top with six gold, seven silver and seven bronze medals.

Men's Thai-Boxing Medals Table

Women's Thai-Boxing Medals Table

Light-Contact

Light-Contact is a form of kickboxing that is less physical than Full-Contact but more so than Semi-Contact and is often seen as a transition between the two.  Contestants score points on the basis of speed and technique over brute force although stoppages can occur, although as with other amateur forms head and body protection must be worn - more detail on Light-Contact rules can be found on the official W.A.K.O. website.  The men had nine weight divisions ranging from 57 kg/125.4 lbs to over 94 kg/+206.8 lbs while the women had six ranging from 50 kg/110 lbs to over 70 kg/154 lbs and unlike more recent W.A.K.O. championships (aside from Lisbon) some countries were allowed more than one athlete per weight division.

As it is often in the shadow of the full contact styles there were not many familiar faces in Light-Contact although Dezső Debreczeni, who is a regular winner in Light and Semi-Contact, won another gold medal.  By the end of the championships Hungary prevented Russia from being top in all three styles at Skopje by winning three golds, two silvers and three bronze.

Men's Light-Contact Kickboxing Medals Table

Women's Light-Contact Kickboxing Medals Table

Overall Medals Standing (Top 5)

See also
List of WAKO Amateur European Championships
List of WAKO Amateur World Championships

References

External links
 WAKO World Association of Kickboxing Organizations Official Site

 
2006 Skopje
Kickboxing in North Macedonia
2006 in kickboxing
Sports competitions in Skopje
November 2006 sports events in Europe
2000s in Skopje